Suroloyo Peak is one of the peaks of Menoreh Mountains on the island of Java, Indonesia.

References

Mountains of Central Java
Landforms of the Special Region of Yogyakarta